Ng Wei Aik (born 20 December 1977) is a Malaysian politician of Chinese origin. He is the former 
Member of Parliament for Tanjong parliamentary constituency for one term from 2013 to 2018, representing Democratic Action Party (DAP), a component of Pakatan Harapan (PH) coalition.

Ng was also the Penang State Assemblyman of Komtar seat for one term from 2008 to 2013.

Ng was dropped by DAP as a candidate in the 2018 general election.

He was also the former political secretary of Lim Guan Eng, chief minister of Penang but he resigned the post in March 2014 to focus on his job as member of parliament.
 
Ng is an alumnus of University of Malaya (UM) and Chung Ling High School. He had completed his law study and obtained a Bachelor Degree of Laws (Hons) from the University of London and currently pursuing for the Certificate of Legal Practice (CLP).

Ng is a Property Manager registered with the Board of Valuers, Appraisers, Estate Agents and Property Managers (BOVEAP) of Malaysia. He published books on Strata Management Tribunal: Your 7-Step Troubleshooting Guide and Strata Management A to Z (Mandarin version).

Election results

References

External links 
 
 

Malaysian politicians of Chinese descent
Malaysian people of Teochew descent
Democratic Action Party (Malaysia) politicians
Members of the Dewan Rakyat
1977 births
Place of birth missing (living people)
Living people